Caeau Pant-y-Bryn is a Site of Special Scientific Interest (SSSI) in Carmarthenshire, Wales.

SSSI
Its north-east boundary abuts the Mountain Road from Glanaman to Coed Llandyfan.

The site is a set of five unimproved fields grazed by ponies, of a type once typical in the area, but now rare. The fields sit on Namurian sandstone and quartzite covered in Pleistocene boulder clay. The SSSI citation for Caeau Pant-y-Bryn specifies that the main feature is "a large stand of purple moor-grass (Molinia caerulea) and meadow thistle (Cirsium dissectum) Fen-meadow". A number of sedges and other plants are notable at the site, including:
carnation sedge (Carex panicea)
tawny sedge (Carex hostiana)
flea sedge (Carex pulicaris)
compact rush (Juncus conglomeratus)
sharp-flowered rush (Juncus acutiflorus)  
meadow thistle (Cirsium dissectum)
whorled  caraway
devil's-bit scabious (Succisa pratensis)
tormentil (Potentilla erecta)

See also
List of Sites of Special Scientific Interest in Carmarthenshire

References

External links
SSSI Citation for Caeau Pant-y-Bryn
Citation map for Caeau Pant-y-Bryn
Your Special Site and its Future - Caeau Pant-y-Bryn SSSI overview from Natural Resources Wales
Caeau Pant-y-Bryn SSSI marked on DEFRA's MAGIC Map

Sites of Special Scientific Interest in Carmarthen & Dinefwr
Meadows in Wales